The Best of Chris Rea is the second compilation album by British singer-songwriter Chris Rea, released in 1994. The album contains 15 previously released songs plus two new tracks, "You Can Go Your Own Way" and "Three Little Green Candles" (the former of which was released as a single to promote the album, with the latter as a B-side). The collection notably omits Rea's 1988 Christmas hit "Driving Home for Christmas". The song "If You Were Me" is a duet between Rea and Elton John, originally released on John's Duets album in 1993.

Track listing
All tracks written by Chris Rea

"You Can Go Your Own Way" and a re-released "Tell Me There's a Heaven" were released as singles in late 1994 to promote this album.

"Three Little Green Candles" is a bonus track which was released slightly earlier on the "You Can Go Your Own Way" single.

Charts

Weekly charts

Year-end charts

Certifications

References 

Chris Rea compilation albums
1994 compilation albums
East West Records compilation albums